Lamont is a very small populated place in the northwest corner of Carbon County, Wyoming, United States. It lies on the northeast edge of the Great Divide Basin.

References

Carbon County, Wyoming